Sungnyong Hall is a shrine dedicated to the founding kings of ancient Korea located in the center of Pyongyang, North Korea. It is listed as National Treasure #6.

History
Sungnyong Hall was constructed in 1429 for the veneration of the mythical founder of the Korean nation, Tangun, and was originally called Tangun Hall.

The shrine was enlarged under the Yi dynasty in 1725, as they sought to promote their legitimacy by emphasizing their connection to Tangun and promoting his veneration. The temple's name was changed to Sungnyong Hall after they expanded its dedication to include Tongmyong, the founder of the kingdom of Koguryo.

The temple was bombed by US forces during the Korean War, which destroyed the caretaker's quarters and shrine storehouses. Today, only the main hall, ceremonial altar, and entrance gate remain of the shrine.

References
 Naenara 
 Korean Central News Agency

Buildings and structures in Pyongyang
National Treasures of North Korea
1429 establishments in Asia
Buildings and structures completed in 1429